Eleonora Wexler (born April 2, 1974, in Buenos Aires, Argentina) is an ACE Awarded Argentine actress, who started her career in Argentine version of the musical Annie, aged nine.

Theatre

Films

Television

Mesa de noticias (1984)
Extraños y Amantes (1985)
El Circo Más Gordo del Mundo (1985)
Humor 5 Estrellas (1985)
Venganza de Mujer (1986)
Vínculos (1987)
La Cuñada (1987)
Su Comedia Favorita (1988)
Plomera de mi Barrio (1988)
Los Tuyos y los Míos (1989)
Alta Comedia (1990)
Estado Civil (1990)
La Banda del Golden Rocket (1991–1992)
El Club de los Baby Sitters (1993)
Solo Para Parejas (1993)
Inconquistable Corazón (1994)
Alta Comedia (1994–1995)
La Hermana Mayor (1995)
Los ángeles no lloran (1996)
El Garante (1997)
Fiscales (1998)
La Condena de Gabriel Doyle (1998)
Como Vos y Yo (1998–1999)
Los Médicos de Hoy 2 (2001)
Ciudad de Pobres Corazones (2002)
Tres Padres Solteros (2003)
Los Simuladores (2003)
Costumbres Argentinas (2003)
Yendo de la Cama al Living (2004)
Amor Mío (2005)
Amor en custodia (2005)
Amas de Casa Desesperadas (2006)
Mujeres Asesinas (2006)
Son de Fierro (2007–2008)
Valientes (2009)
Un año para recordar (2011)
Condicionados (2012)
Historia clínica (2013)
Vecinos en Guerra (2013)
Noche & Día (2014–2015)
Amar después de amar (2017)
La valla (2020)

Awards 
ACE Award for the Best Actress in Dramatic Comedy (La Hija del Aire) - WON

Nominations
 2013 Martín Fierro Awards
 Best actress of daily comedy (for Los vecinos en guerra)
 Best actress of miniseries

References

External links 

Argentine television actresses
Argentine telenovela actresses
1974 births
Living people
Actresses from Buenos Aires
Argentine child actresses